The 21st Quebec Cinema Awards, the 21st overall ceremony in the history of the Quebec Cinema Awards, were held on June 2, 2019 in Montreal. Cinematographer Pierre Mignot also received the Iris Tribute.

Winners and nominees
Nominees and winners are:

References

Quebec
2018 in Canadian cinema
2019 in Quebec
21